Ian Ward Griffiths (born 1966) is a British businessman. He is the CFO and Deputy CEO of Kantar Group, a data analytics and brand consulting company.

Early life 
Ian Ward Griffiths was born in September 1966. He has a master's degree from. He is a qualified accountant.

Career 
Griffiths worked for the accountants Ernst & Young for six years, before joining the magazines, radio and business media group Emap in 1994, and was group finance director from 2005 to 2008. 

In 2008, Griffiths joined ITV plc as finance director.

He was the COO, CFO, and interim CEO of the media company ITV plc from May 2017 to December 2018, following Adam Crozier's departure after seven years as CEO. He played a key role in transforming ITV plc into an international and digital business, rather than one reliant on UK advertising.

Griffiths was succeeded as ITV's CEO by Carolyn McCall in January 2018, and he returned to being the group's CFO and COO, before leaving the business in March 2019.

On June 30, 2020 Griffiths joined Kantar Group as its CFO and Deputy CEO. He also headed the group for an interim when Alexis Nasard, then CEO of Kantar Group decide to step down from the position.

Awards 
In 2013, he won FTSE 100 FD of the Year.

References

1966 births
Living people
British chief executives
British television executives